"Just Like Paradise" is a song by American rock singer David Lee Roth. Released after he left Van Halen, it was produced by Roth and guitarist Steve Vai. The lead single from Roth's second solo album, 1988's Skyscraper, it reached the top 10 in the United States and Canada.

Music video
The video for the single was released in January 1988. Like other Roth videos, it heavily featured live stage performance. Between are clips of Roth rock climbing at Half Dome shot by Emmy Award-winning mountain climbing photographer David Breashears. "I started climbing when I was 11, in the Boy Scouts," he recalled. "It was a natural thing, plus you add in the books and comics and the movies. I'd say, 'Aw, I don't want to be the actor, I want to go to Arabia!" The video concludes with Roth on a 28-foot surfboard gliding across a concert crowd. "You ask four different people their impression of [the surfboard], you get six different responses," he observed. "I had a driver called Cowboy, a chopper pilot during the Tet Offensive. He said to me one day at rehearsal, 'Goddamn Dave: that reminds me of 'Nam… contour-flying over a hostile landing zone!' Then again, everything reminded Cowboy of 'Nam!" Noisecreep ranked the video 10th on their list of the best David Lee Roth videos.

Release and reception
Released in 1987, "Just Like Paradise" entered the Billboard Hot 100 in January 1988 and peaked at number six in March. 
It reached number four on the Singles Sales chart and eight on the Hot 100 Airplay chart. It also spent four weeks atop the Mainstream Rock chart. The song peaked at eight in Canada, 
number 27 in the United Kingdom, 
number 13 in New Zealand, and number 77 in the Netherlands.

Music critic Charles Bottomley called the song "a polished ode to decadence, with a chorus you would be unashamed to punch the air to". 
Allmusic's Eduardo Rivadavia described it as an "ultra-saccharine" single that tries "too hard to achieve an exaggerated pop sheen".

Track listing
7" Vinyl
"Just Like Paradise" (Roth, Tuggle) - 4:03
"The Bottom Line" (Roth, Vai) - 3:37

12" Vinyl (UK)
"Just Like Paradise" (Roth, Tuggle) - 4:03
"The Bottom Line" (Roth, Vai) - 3:37
"Yankee Rose" (Roth, Vai) - 3:47

Chart performance

Year-end charts

References

1988 singles
David Lee Roth songs
Songs written by David Lee Roth
1987 songs
Warner Records singles